Grand Prix scientifique de la Fondation NRJ (The Scientific Grand Prize of the Foundation NRJ) is an award conferred annually by the Foundation NRJ at the Institut de France. It is awarded in the areas of medical science, particularly neuroscience. Each year the prize has a different theme. The award has a €150,000 prize (€130,000 for laboratory research and €20,000 for the laureate).

Laureates 
Winners of the prize are:
 2017: Jean-Yves Delattre
 2016: 
 2015: 
 2014: 
 2013: Massimo Zeviani
 2012: Isabelle Arnulf and Mehdi Tafti
 2011: Séverine Boillée and Vincent Meininger
 2010: José A. Esteban and Bruno Dubois
 2009: Luis Garcia-Larrea and John N. Wood
 2008: Catherine Lubetzki and Anne Baron-van Vercooren
 2007:  and Béatrice Desgranges
 2006: José-Alain Sahel
 2005: Patrice Tran Ba Huy and Guy Richardson
 2004: Piotr Topilko
 2003: Olivier Dulac
 2002: Antoine Guedeney
 2001: Catherine Billard-Davou
 2000: Alain Fischer

See also

 List of medicine awards

References 

Institut de France
Medicine awards
French science and technology awards
Awards established in 2000